The Catedral Del Espiritu Santo is the seat of the Roman Catholic Diocese of Nuevo Laredo. It is located at Paseo Colon Avenue in the heart of the midtown Nuevo Laredo. The first bishop to sit here was Ricardo Watty Urquidi. As of 2000, the cathedral was the mother church for 800,000 Catholics in the diocese.

Bishops
Ricardo Watty Urquidi, M.Sp.S. (1989–2008),
Gustavo Rodriquez Vega, (2008–2015)

References

Nuevo Laredo
Roman Catholic cathedrals in Mexico
Buildings and structures in Tamaulipas
Tourist attractions in Tamaulipas